The Xeelee Sequence is a series of hard science fiction space opera novels, novellas, and short stories written by British science fiction author Stephen Baxter. The series spans billions of years of fictional history, centering on humanity's future expansion into the universe, its intergalactic war with an enigmatic and supremely powerful Kardashev Type IV alien civilization called the Xeelee (eldritch symbiotes composed of spacetime defects, Bose-Einstein condensates, and baryonic matter), and the Xeelee's own cosmos-spanning war with dark matter entities called Photino Birds. The series features many other species and civilizations that play a prominent role, including the Squeem (a species of group-mind aquatics), the Qax (beings whose biology is based on the complex interactions of convection cells), and the Silver Ghosts (colonies of symbiotic organisms encased in reflective skins). Several stories in the Sequence also deal with humans and posthumans living in extreme conditions, such as at the heart of a neutron star (Flux), in a separate universe with considerably stronger gravity (Raft), and within eusocial hive societies (Coalescent).

The Xeelee Sequence deals with many concepts stemming from the fringe of theoretical physics and futurology, such as artificial wormholes, time travel, exotic-matter physics, naked singularities, closed timelike curves, multiple universes, hyperadvanced computing and artificial intelligence, faster-than-light travel, spacetime engineering, quantum wave function beings, and the upper echelons of the Kardashev scale. Thematically, the series deals heavily with certain existential and social philosophical issues, such as striving for survival and relevance in a harsh and unknowable universe and the effects of war and militarism on society.

As of August 2018, the series is composed of 9 novels and 53 short pieces (short stories and novellas, with most collected in 3 anthologies), all of which fit into a fictional timeline stretching from the Big Bang's singularity of the past to the eventual heat death of the universe and Timelike Infinitys singularity of the future. An omnibus edition of the first four Xeelee novels (Raft, Timelike Infinity, Flux, and Ring), entitled Xeelee: An Omnibus, was released in January 2010. In August 2016, the entire series of all novels and stories (up to that date) was released as one volume in e-book format entitled Xeelee Sequence: The Complete Series. Baxter's Destiny's Children series is part of the Xeelee Sequence.

Conception

Baxter first conceived of the Xeelee while hobby writing a short story in the summer of 1986 (eventually published in Interzone as "The Xeelee Flower" the following year).  He incorporated powerful off-stage aliens to explain the story's titular artifact, and in pondering the backstory began to flesh out the basics of what would later become the main players and setting of the Sequence: a universe full of intelligent species that live in the shadow of the incomprehensible and god-like Xeelee.

Plot overview

The overarching plot of the Xeelee Sequence involves an intergalactic war between humanity and the Xeelee, and a cosmic war between the Xeelee and the Photino Birds, with the latter two being alien species that originated in the early universe.  The technologically advanced Xeelee primarily inhabit supermassive black holes, manipulating their event horizons to create preferable living environments, construction materials, tools, and computing devices.  The Photino Birds are a dark matter-based species that live in the gravity wells of stars, who are likely not aware of baryonic life forms due to dark matter's weak interactions with normal matter.  Due to the inevitable risk of their habitats being destroyed by supernovae and other consequences of stellar evolution, the Photino Birds work to halt nuclear fusion in the cores of stars, prematurely aging them into stable white dwarfs. The resulting dwarfs provide them with suitable habitats for billions of times longer than other types of stars could, but at the expense of other forms of life on nearby planets. The Photino Birds' activities also effectively stop the formation of new black holes due to a lack of Type II supernovae, threatening the existence of the Xeelee and their cosmic projects.

After overcoming a series of brutal occupations by extraterrestrial civilizations, humanity expands into the galaxy with an extremely xenophobic and militaristic outlook, with aims to exterminate other species they encounter. Humans eventually become the second-most advanced and widespread civilization in the Milky Way galaxy, after the Xeelee.  Unaware of the Photino–Xeelee war and the existential ramifications of what is at stake, humanity come to the (unwarranted) conclusion that the Xeelee are a sinister and destructive threat to their hegemony and security.  Through a bitter war of attrition, humans end up containing the Xeelee to the galactic core. Both humans and the Xeelee gain strategic intelligence by using time travel as a war tactic, through the use of closed timelike curves, resulting in a stalemate for thousands of years. Eventually, humanity develops defensive, movable pocket universes to compartmentalize and process information, and an exotic weapon able to damage the ecological stability of the core's supermassive black hole. Minutes after the first successful strike, the Xeelee withdraw from the galaxy, effectively ceding the Milky Way to fully human control. Humanity continued to advance technologically for a hundred thousand years afterwards, then attacked the Xeelee across the Local Group of galaxies. However, despite having annoyed the Xeelee enough to give up activities in the Milky Way, humans, having become an extremely powerful Type III civilization themselves at this point, prove only to be a minor distraction to the Xeelee on the whole, being ultimately unable to meaningfully challenge their dominance across the universe.

Although the Xeelee are masters of space and time capable of influencing their own evolution, they are ultimately unsuccessful in stopping the Photino Birds. They instead utilize cosmic strings to build an enormous ring-like structure (which comes to be known as Bolder's Ring, or simply the Ring) to permit easy travel to other universes, allowing them and other species to escape the Photino Birds' destruction of the universe. The Xeelee, despite their unapproachable aloofness and transcendent superiority, appear to be compassionate and charitable toward the younger and less advanced species that inhabit the universe, demonstrating this by doing such things as constructing a specially-made universe suited to the Silver Ghosts, who humans had nearly driven to extinction. Humans are likewise shown compassion by them and allowed to use the Ring to escape, despite their relentless long war against the Xeelee.

Books

Xeelee Sequence main novels

Destiny's Children sub-series novels

Collections of short stories and novellas

Currently uncollected stories

Chronology and reading order

The novels in chronological order (as opposed to publication order) are given below. Some of the novels contain elements occurring at different points in the timeline. The story anthologies (Vacuum Diagrams, Resplendent, and Xeelee: Endurance) each contain stories taking place across the entire chronology.

In 2009, Baxter posted a detailed chronology of the Xeelee Sequence explaining the proper chronological reading order of all the novels, novellas, and short stories up to that year.  The timeline was updated in September 2015.

When asked directly for a suggested reading order, the author wrote: "I hope that all the books and indeed the stories can be read stand-alone. I'm not a great fan of books that end with cliff-hangers. So you could go in anywhere. One way would be to start with Vacuum Diagrams, a collection that sets out the overall story of the universe. Then Timelike Infinity and Ring which tell the story of Michael Poole, then Raft and Flux which are really incidents against the wider background, and finally Destiny's Children."

Reception

Science fiction author Paul J. McAuley has praised Baxter and the series, saying:

See also
Stephen Baxter (author)
Hard science fiction
Space opera
Great Attractor
Kardashev scale

Notes
Baxter cites the pronunciation "ch-ee-lee" in Xeelee: Vengeance.  It's unclear why, given the history of the author himself pronouncing it as "zee-lee", but one possible reason is that it reflects how the name came to be pronounced in-universe due to language change, especially considering Baxter's prior references to glottochronology in the series.   
Winner of the BSFA Award for Best Short Fiction, 2004

References

External links
 Stephen Baxter's official website.
 The complete (as of September 2015) timeline for the Xeelee Sequence of novels and stories, hosted on Baxter's official website.
 

 
Book series introduced in 1991
Fictional universes
Novels about extraterrestrial life
Stephen Baxter series
Space opera
Transhumanism in fiction
Artificial intelligence in fiction
Artificial wormholes in fiction
Fiction about consciousness transfer
Fiction about immortality
Fiction about the Solar System
Fiction about time travel
Fiction set in the 7th millennium or beyond
Quantum fiction novels
Dystopian novels
Cosmic horror